Weatherford  is a city and the county seat of Parker County, Texas, United States. In 2020, its population was 30,854. Weatherford is named after Thomas J. Weatherford, a State senator and advocate for Texas’ secession to the Confederate States.

History

Beginnings
In 1854, Methodist Reverend Pleasant Tackett led 15 pioneer families into a land they called "Goshen," which would later become part of Parker County, itself to be created the following year by the efforts of State Representative Isaac Parker and State Senator Thomas Jefferson Weatherford in the Texas State Legislature. In 1856

The railroad arrived in June 1880. The Santa Fe Depot (which houses the Weatherford Chamber of Commerce) was built in 1908 under Jim Crow laws, with waiting rooms segregated and separated by the ticket office.

Geography

It is the county seat for Parker County.

Climate
The climate in this area is characterized by relatively high temperatures and evenly distributed precipitation throughout the year.  The Köppen Climate System describes the weather as humid subtropical, and uses the abbreviation Cfa.

Demographics

2020

As of the 2020 United States census, there were 30,854 people, 11,528 households, and 7,643 families residing in the city.

2008

The 2008 census for the population of the City of Weatherford, Texas is 26,686 with a population density of 1,175.59 people per square mile. The population grew by 40.5% from 2000 to 2008. The racial makeup of the city in 2008 is 85.50% White, 10.20% Hispanic, 2.10% Black, 1.30% American Indian, 0.70% Asian, 4.10% other. Weatherford's average household size is 2.5.

The average income per household was $50,924, in the year 2007. The estimated 2007 city capita was $26,380.

1999
According to the 1999 census,  25.0% of the population is under the age of 18, 10.6% is 18 to 24, 26.3% is 25 to 44, 21.8% is 45 to 64, and 16.4% is 65 years of age or older. The median age is 36 years.

Arts and culture
Weatherford is within the Bible Belt.

The Weatherford area is a large peach producer, and was named "Peach Capital of Texas" by the Texas Legislature. The peach is celebrated each year at the Parker County Peach Festival, which is Weatherford's largest event and one of the best-attended festivals in Texas.

Weatherford has been described as the "cutting horse capital of the world".

The headquarters of the National Snaffle Bit Association, an equestrian organization, is located in Weatherford.

Historic buildings
Several homes of the Queen Anne and Victorian styles were built at the turn of the 20th century; some are open for tours, arranged by the Parker County Heritage Society.  The Parker County Courthouse is of the Second Empire style.

Government

Phil King represents Weatherford in the Texas House of Representatives.

Education
Weatherford is served by the Weatherford Independent School District.

Weatherford College is a 150-year-old community college, with more than 35 study areas and 19 professional/technical programs. The college was originally built by Masons and was one of the first in Texas.

Media
The Weatherford Democrat has been publishing since 1895. The Weatherford Telegram began publishing as a weekly newspaper in 2006.

Notable people
 Zach Britton, Major League Baseball pitcher who pitched for the Baltimore Orioles and New York Yankees
 Mary Couts Burnett (1856–1924), philanthropist
 Douglas Chandor (1897–1953), British-born portrait painter and garden designer, Chandor Gardens in Weatherford
 Thomas Stevenson Drew, the third governor of Arkansas, lived for a time in Weatherford before he relocated to Hood County, Texas
 Joe B. Frantz, historian on the faculty of the University of Texas at Austin, was born in Dallas but reared in Weatherford
 Phil King, politician
 Bob Kingsley, radio personality. He was host of the nationally syndicated programs American Country Countdown (ACC) from 1978 to 2005 and Bob Kingsley's Country Top 40 from 2006 until his death in 2019
 Edwin Lanham, author; was reared in Weatherford, the slightly veiled setting for his most critically acclaimed work "The Wind Blew West"
 Kapron Lewis-Moore, defensive lineman for the Baltimore Ravens
 Mary Martin, a Broadway star, known for her portrayal of Peter Pan. Her son, Larry Hagman, became a TV star, best known as J.R. Ewing on the television melodrama Dallas. Hagman made appearances for special occasions and to assist many Weatherford charities as his brother still lives in Weatherford
 Jack Porter, U.S. Senate candidate in 1948 and a builder of the modern Texas Republican Party
 William Hood Simpson (May 18, 1888 – August 15, 1980), lieutenant general, commanded the U.S. Ninth Army in northern Europe, during World War II
 Bob Tallman, nationally known rodeo announcer, operates a ranch in Parker County near Weatherford
 Hippo Vaughn, Major League Baseball pitcher who pitched for the Chicago Cubs 1913–1921
 Jim Wright, Former Speaker of the United States House of Representatives; grew up in Weatherford and wrote a book about his youth, Weatherford Days…a Time of Learning 
 Taylor Sheridan, American screenwriter

In popular culture
Cattle drover Oliver Loving is buried in Weatherford's Greenwood Cemetery. After being attacked by Indians in New Mexico in 1867, Loving's dying wish to his friend, Charles Goodnight, was to be buried at his home, Parker County. Goodnight brought the body back six hundred miles by wagon for burial. The story is the inspiration behind Texas author Larry McMurtry's novel, Lonesome Dove.

A year earlier, Goodnight had invented the first chuckwagon which catered to cowboys on a cattle drive that would later become known as the Goodnight-Loving Trail.

Bose Ikard, who served with Goodnight and for whom the McMurtry character "Deets" was modeled, was also laid to rest in the Greenwood Cemetery.

Sports

Baseball
Raymond E. Curtis Field

Notes

References

External links
 City of Weatherford
 Weatherford Chamber of Commerce
 View Historic photos of Weatherford from the Weatherford College Library, hosted by the Portal to Texas History

Dallas–Fort Worth metroplex
Cities in Parker County, Texas
Cities in Texas
County seats in Texas